Andreas Choi Chang-mou is the fourth Archbishop of Gwangju.  Born in Paju, Gyeonggi Province, Korea in 1936, he was ordained a priest of the Archdiocese of Seoul on June 9, 1963.

On February 3, 1994, he was appointed Auxiliary Bishop of Seoul and Titular Bishop of Flumenpiscense.  On February 9, 1999, he was appointed Coadjutor Archbishop of Gwangju and succeeded Archbishop Victorinus Youn Kong-hi upon the latter's retirement on November 11, 2000.

External links

Profile from the Catholic Bishops' Conference of Korea
Profile from Catholic Hierarchy

1936 births
Living people
People from Paju
South Korean Roman Catholic archbishops
Roman Catholic archbishops of Gwangju
Roman Catholic bishops of Seoul
Roman Catholic bishops of Gwangju